The Fibonacci numbers are the best known concept named after Leonardo of Pisa, known as Fibonacci.  Among others are the following.

Concepts in mathematics and computing

A professional association and a scholarly journal that it publishes
 The Fibonacci Association
 Fibonacci Quarterly

An asteroid
 6765 Fibonacci

An art rock band
 The Fibonaccis

Fibonacci